Stephen Baldwin (born 1966) is an American actor.

Stephen Baldwin may also refer to:

Stephen Baldwin (politician) (born 1982), American politician
Stephen Livingstone Baldwin (1835–1902), American missionary

See also
Frank Stephen Baldwin (1838–1925), American inventor